Hyposidra picaria is a geometer moth in the Ennominae subfamily first described by Francis Walker in 1866. It is found throughout Sundaland.

Larvae have been reared on Acacia mangium.

External links

Boarmiini
Ennominae
Moths of Borneo
Moths of Malaysia
Moths described in 1866